Bull Run Creek is a stream in the U.S. state of South Dakota.

Bull Run Creek was named for an incident when a runaway bull roamed the area.

See also
 List of rivers of South Dakota

References

Rivers of Meade County, South Dakota
Rivers of South Dakota